Radio Luxembourg may refer to:
Radio Luxembourg, a commercial radio station in English, begun in 1933 and closed in 1992
Radio Luxembourg, now known as RTL, a French-language commercial radio station begun in 1933
Radio Luxemburg, now RTL Radio, a German-language station begun after World War II
Radio Luxemburg, a commercial radio station in Dutch, begun in 1933
Radio 1212, an Allied black propaganda radio station operated from 1944 to 1945
Radio Luxembourg (DRM), a commercial station begun in 2005